Irene Espínola Pérez (born 19 December 1992) is a Spanish handball player for Neckarsulmer SU and the Spanish national team.

She was selected as part of the Spanish 35-player squad for the 2020 European Women's Handball Championship. She was also part of the extended squad at the 2019 World Women's Handball Championship.

References

1992 births
Living people
Spanish female handball players
Sportspeople from Almuñécar
Expatriate handball players
Spanish expatriate sportspeople in Germany
Spanish expatriate sportspeople in Romania